The 1977 Island Holidays Classic, also known as the Hawaii Open, was a men's tennis tournament played an outdoor hard courts in Maui, Hawaii, in the United States that was part of the 1977 Colgate-Palmolive Grand Prix circuit and categorized as 3 star event. It was the fourth edition of the tournament and was held from October 3 through October 9, 1977. First-seeded Jimmy Connors won the singles title, his second at the event after 1975.

Finals

Singles
 Jimmy Connors defeated  Brian Gottfried 6–2, 6–0
 It was Connors's 5th singles title of the year and the 58th of his career.

Doubles
 Stan Smith /  Bob Lutz defeated  Brian Gottfried /  Raúl Ramírez 7–6, 6–4

References

Island Holidays Classic
Island Holidays Classic
Island Holidays Classic
Island Holidays Classic
Hawaii Open